Array BioPharma  is an American clinical stage, pharmaceutical company that focuses on oncology medication headquartered in Boulder, Colorado. The company is a subsidiary of Pfizer.

History
In 1998, the company was founded by Drs. Tony Piscopio, Kevin Koch, David Snitman, and K.C. Nicolaou.

In November 2000, the company became a public company via an initial public offering.

In June 2019, Pfizer acquired the company for approximately $11 billion.

References

1998 establishments in Colorado
2000 initial public offerings
2019 mergers and acquisitions
American companies established in 1998
Pharmaceutical companies established in 1998
Biotechnology companies established in 1998
Pharmaceutical companies of the United States
Companies formerly listed on the Nasdaq
Biotechnology companies of the United States
Health care companies based in Colorado
Companies based in Boulder, Colorado
Pfizer
Biopharmaceutical companies